Crow Lake is a former lake in White County, Arkansas.

References

Lakes of Arkansas
Bodies of water of White County, Arkansas